Aderet is a moshav in central Israel. Located in the Judean foothills in the Adullam region, south of Beit Shemesh, west of Gush Etzion and overlooking the Valley of Elah, it falls under the jurisdiction of Mateh Yehuda Regional Council.

History
The moshav was founded in the early 1959 by Jewish immigrants from Romania. All of the initial settlers, however, left the site. In 1963, the government re-established the town and brought in Jewish immigrants from the Atlas Mountains in Morocco. Its name was taken from Book of Ezekiel 17:8, meaning "mighty" in the phrase "mighty vine", a symbol of reborn Israel. The name recalls the viticulture in the area.

The residents were involved in poultry farming and other agricultural activities until the late 1980s, when the village evolved into a dormitory community for Jerusalem (40 km) and Tel Aviv (65 km). In 1997 a new neighborhood was built, bringing the population to over 110 families. An additional building project started in late 2006 for seventy plots.

Education
There are two kindergartens located on the moshav. School-age children are bused outside the community mostly to either Alon Shvut or Rosh Tzurim. A pre-military mechina, open to both religious and non-religious students, was founded after the year 2000. There are four synagogues in Aderet, and the chief rabbi is Moshe Dadon.

Tourism
In the vicinity of Aderet are a vineyard and number of archeological sites from the Roman and Byzantine Eras, including the Atari and Midras ruins from the period of the Bar Kokhba revolt. The cave of Adullam, famous as a refuge for David during his period of flight from King Saul, is 1 km south of Aderet, and the ancient site of Sokho, now famous for its annual flowering of lupines, is 2 km north.

Gallery

References

Moshavim
Populated places established in 1961
Medieval sites in Israel
Populated places in Jerusalem District
1961 establishments in Israel
Moroccan-Jewish culture in Israel
Valley of Elah